Jens Petter Hauge (born 12 October 1999) is a Norwegian professional footballer who plays as a winger for Belgian Pro League club Gent, on loan from Eintracht Frankfurt. He represents the Norway national team.

Club career

Bodø/Glimt
Born in Bodø, Nordland, spending his childhood years in FK Vinkelen, and progressing through the youth academy of Bodø/Glimt, Hauge signed his first professional contract with the club on 12 April 2016. The following day he made his senior debut in a 6–0 cup win against IF Fløya as a 64th-minute substitute for Fitim Azemi. He immediately scored a hat-trick. Hauge made his league debut on 23 April against Strømsgodset where he came on as a late substitute as Bodø/Glimt lost 2–0. In the next league games he featured regularly, and on 8 July, he scored his first top-flight goal in the 4–1 away win over IK Start, becoming Bodø/Glimt's youngest ever goalscorer in the Eliteserien. In the 2016 season, he made 20 league appearances in which he scored one goal, as Bodø/Glimt suffered relegation to the second-tier Norwegian First Division.

In the following season, Hauge established himself as an undisputed starter as Bodø/Glimt won the second-tier championship and made their immediate return to the top-flight Eliteserien. He made a significant contribution that season, scoring two goals and making 13 assists. At the start of the 2018 season, Hauge again lost his starting role, and as a result was loaned to the second-tier club Aalesunds FK, on 15 August 2018, halfway through the season, after 11 league appearances in which he scored no goals. In Aalesund, he had made only six league appearances by the end of the season.

During the course of the following season, Hauge made it back into the starting line-up of Bodø/Glimt. On 10 November 2019, he scored both goals for his club in a 2–3 away defeat to Rosenborg. That season, he made 28 league appearances in which he scored seven goals and registered two assists. 

Scheduled to begin in March, the 2020 season, was postponed until June 2020 due to the COVID-19 pandemic. Hauge and Bodø/Glimt got off to an excellent start. After ten match-days, the club surprisingly took a lead in the league table. At that point, Hauge had already scored six goals and assisted six. He also managed to impress in the UEFA Europa League qualifiers. In the narrow 2–3 away defeat to Italian club A.C. Milan, Hauge was directly involved in both his team's goals. As a result, media reported that the Rossoneri were interested in signing him.

A.C. Milan
On 1 October 2020, Hauge signed a five-year contract with Serie A club A.C. Milan. On 4 October 2020, he made his debut in a 3–0 win over Spezia. On 22 October 2020, he scored his first goal for Milan in a 3–1 win at Celtic in the group stage of the Europa League. On 22 November 2020, he scored his first Serie A goal in a 3–1 away win over Napoli.

Loan to Eintracht Frankfurt
On 10 August 2021, Eintracht Frankfurt announced that Hauge would join the Bundesliga club on a season-long loan with an option to make the deal permanent. He scored a goal in his Frankfurt debut although in a 5–2 loss against Borussia Dortmund, on 14 August 2021.

Eintracht Frankfurt
On 28 May 2022, Eintracht Frankfurt announced that they have activated purchase option for Hauge from Serie A club AC Milan following his one-year loan. Hauge signed his contract until 2026.

Loan to Gent
On 16 August 2022, Gent announced that Hauge would join the Belgian First Division A club on a season-long loan.

Personal life
Hauge has a younger brother, Runar, who is also a professional footballer who plays for Hibernian; the pair has played together for Bodø/Glimt, the club where they both made their debuts.

International career
He made his national team debut on 11 October 2020 in a Nations League game against Romania.

Career statistics

Club

International

Honours
Bodø/Glimt
Eliteserien: 2020

Eintracht Frankfurt
UEFA Europa League: 2021–22

Individual
Eliteserien Young Player of the Year: 2020

References

External links

Jens Petter Hauge at NFF

1999 births
Living people
Sportspeople from Bodø
Norwegian footballers
Norway youth international footballers
Norway under-21 international footballers
Norway international footballers
Association football midfielders
FK Bodø/Glimt players
Aalesunds FK players
A.C. Milan players
Eintracht Frankfurt players
K.A.A. Gent players
UEFA Europa League winning players
Eliteserien players
Norwegian First Division players
Serie A players
Bundesliga players
Norwegian expatriate footballers
Expatriate footballers in Italy
Norwegian expatriate sportspeople in Italy
Expatriate footballers in Germany
Norwegian expatriate sportspeople in Germany
Expatriate footballers in Belgium
Norwegian expatriate sportspeople in Belgium